Don't Tell Her It's Me (alternately titled The Boyfriend School) is a 1990 comedy film starring Steve Guttenberg, Shelley Long, Jami Gertz and Kyle MacLachlan. The film was directed by Malcolm Mowbray and written by Sarah Bird (adapted from her novel The Boyfriend School).

Plot

Gus Kubicek (played by Guttenberg) is a depressed and overweight cartoonist who recently won a battle against Hodgkin's disease. His caring sister Lizzie Potts (Long), a nosy romance novelist, responds to his sadness by trying to set him up with a suitable woman. Yet to do so she must make him seem more dynamic and attractive. When Gus falls in love with Emily Pear (Gertz), he adopts the persona of Lobo Marunga, a leather-clad biker from New Zealand.

Emily ends up falling for Lobo but Gus tries to tell Emily the truth as he ends up in bed with her. The next day Lobo tells Emily that he's Gus and she gets furious with him and tells him to get out. Gus, hurt, supposedly goes away to New York when in fact he is going to a friend's wedding. The movie ends with Emily tracking down Gus at the airport and they share a kiss as Lizzie watches through binoculars.

Cast

 Steve Guttenberg as Gus Kubicek
 Shelley Long as Lizzie Potts
 Jami Gertz as Emily Pear
 Kyle MacLachlan as Trout
 Mädchen Amick as Mandy
 Kevin Scannell as Mitchell Potts
 Beth Grant as Babette
 O'Neal Compton as Gas Station Attendant

References

External links
 
 
 

1990 films
1990 romantic comedy films
1990s English-language films
Films based on American novels
Films directed by Malcolm Mowbray
Films shot in South Carolina
American romantic comedy films
1990s American films